Wang Jinbo (born May 15, 1995) is a Chinese curler from Harbin. He competed at the 2015 Ford World Men's Curling Championship in Halifax, Nova Scotia, Canada, as lead for the Chinese team, which placed 8th in the tournament. He was member of the Chinese team that won gold medals at the 2014 Pacific-Asia Curling Championships.

References

External links
 

1995 births
Living people
Chinese male curlers
Sportspeople from Harbin
Curlers at the 2012 Winter Youth Olympics
Pacific-Asian curling champions